Marian Kramer (born 1944 in Baton Rouge, Louisiana) is a civil rights, poverty, and labor activist based in Detroit, Michigan.

Family and childhood

Early life
Kramer has been involved with the Civil Rights Movement since childhood, when she attended community meetings and rallies with family members. While studying at Southern University in Baton Rouge, Kramer further immersed herself in the Civil Rights Movement. She is the recipient of numerous awards for community service. In 2004, Kramer was awarded an Alston/Bannerman Fellowship, a fellowship for esteemed, long-time community activists of color. She was interviewed for the Global Feminisms Project on March 5, 2004.

Marriage and children
In 1979 Marian Kramer married General Gordon Baker Jr (1941-2014†), a prominent labor organizer and activist. Together they have five children.

Activism 
Marian Kramer has been a large part of the welfare and civil rights movements since the early 1960s. Kramer worked for the Congress of Racial Equality (CORE) as an organizer for their voter registration campaign. She currently serves as the cochair of the National Welfare Rights Union, an organization she founded with her peers.

Organizational Affiliations 

 Lawyers' Committee for Civil Rights Under Law
 National Council of Negro Women
 African-American Women's Caucus 
 Women of Color Caucus
 National Anti-Hunger Coalition
 National Organization for Women
 Congress of Racial Equality (CORE)
 Wayne County Welfare Rights Organization
 United Auto Workers

Organizations Co-Founded 

 National Welfare Rights Union
 Black Panther Party (in Detroit, MI)
 Welfare Workers for Justice

Publications 
Kramer, M. (1994). Remarks on the National Welfare Rights Union. Social Justice, 21(1 (55)), 9-11.

References 

African-American feminists
1944 births
Living people
People from Baton Rouge, Louisiana
Activists from Louisiana
Activists from Detroit
Southern University alumni
Activists for African-American civil rights
21st-century African-American people
21st-century African-American women
20th-century African-American people